Blåbärskullen transmitter is a facility for FM/TV-broadcasting at Sunne in Sweden, which went in service on September 2, 1960. On December 27, 1979, the top of the mast with the TV-broadcasting antennas fell down as result of an excessive build-up of ice.

The mast was equipped afterwards with new broadcasting antennas.

References

Towers in Sweden
Radio masts and towers in Europe
1960 establishments in Sweden
Towers completed in 1960